Archie Haggie Harris Jr. (July 3, 1918 – October 29, 1965) was an American world-record-setting discus thrower and football player.

Raised in Ocean City, New Jersey, Harris graduated in 1937 from Ocean City High School.

As an Indiana University student-athlete, Harris won the 1940 NCAA Track and Field Championships, defending his title 1941 with the world record of 53.26 m. In 1941 he also became US champion. At, Indiana, Harris also played football, lettering on the Indiana Hoosiers football team in 1938, and 1939, and 1940. He was a second-team selection on the 1940 All-Big Ten Conference football team as an end.

During World War II Harris joined the United States Army Air Forces, reaching the rank of second lieutenant and serving as a bomber pilot in the 332d Fighter Group, known as the Tuskegee Airmen. An African American, he was unable to find a job as a commercial pilot after the war. He became physical education teacher at the YMCA in Harlem.

In 2001 he was inducted into the Indiana University Athletics Hall of Fame.

Harris died on October 29, 1965, at Veterans Administration Hospital in New York City.

References

External links
 
 

1918 births
1965 deaths
American football ends
American male discus throwers
Indiana Hoosiers football players
Indiana Hoosiers men's track and field athletes
People from Ocean City, New Jersey
Sportspeople from Cape May County, New Jersey
Tuskegee Airmen
United States Army Air Forces officers
Players of American football from New Jersey
Track and field athletes from New Jersey
African-American players of American football
African-American male track and field athletes
Military personnel from New Jersey
20th-century African-American sportspeople